LaBrandon Cordell Toefield (born September 24, 1980) is a former American football running back. He was drafted by the Jacksonville Jaguars in the fourth round of the 2003 NFL draft. He played college football at Louisiana State University.

Toefield was also a member of the Carolina Panthers and New York Sentinels.

Early years
Toefield was born and raised in Independence, Louisiana. He attended Independence High School, where he played for the high school football team under head coach Charles Baglio. Toefield excelled as a sophomore rushing for 1,800 yards and 32 touchdowns.  As a junior Toefield lead Independence to the 3A state championship before losing to Evangel Christian Academy.  In Toefield's junior season he rushed for 2,800 yards and 45 touchdowns.  He injured his knee in the spring of that year and did not play as a senior.

College career
Toefield was a three-year starter at Louisiana State. As a junior named an All-Southeastern Conference first-team selection by league’s coaches and Associated Press. 
Toefield rushed for 2,149 yards with 26 touchdowns on 511 carries, ranking ninth in school history in rushing yards, eighth in rushing scores and sixth in carries. Started 10 games as a freshman, 11 games as a junior and 9 games as a senior. He led all freshman running backs in the SEC with 682 yards on 165 carries with five touchdowns. Toefield majored in general studies.

Professional career

Jacksonville Jaguars
Toefield was a backup running back for the Jacksonville Jaguars, behind Fred Taylor and usually Maurice Jones-Drew, until 2008.

Carolina Panthers
On March 7, 2008, he was signed by the Carolina Panthers. He was released during final cuts on August 30 and spent the year out of football.

New York Sentinels
Toefield was drafted by the New York Sentinels of the United Football League in the UFL Premiere Season Draft. He signed with the team on August 27, 2009. Just bought a retirement home in Florida.

External links
Just Sports Stats
LSU Tigers bio
United Football League bio

1980 births
Living people
People from Independence, Louisiana
Players of American football from Louisiana
American football running backs
LSU Tigers football players
Jacksonville Jaguars players
Carolina Panthers players
New York Sentinels players